Greenhill power station supplied electricity to the town of Oldham, England and the surrounding area from 1921 to 1960. It replaced the older Rhodes Bank generating station and was superseded by Chadderton B power station. Greenhill power station was owned and operated by Oldham Corporation until the nationalisation of the British electricity supply industry in 1948. The power station was built over the period 1921–24 and was decommissioned in 1960.

History
In 1890 Oldham Corporation applied for a Provisional Order under the Electric Lighting Acts to generate and supply electricity to the town. This was granted by the Board of Trade and was confirmed by Parliament through the Electric Lighting Orders Confirmation (No. 3) Act 1890 (54 & 55 Vict. c. clxxxviii). The power station was built in Gas Street at Rhodes Bank (53°32'24"N 2°06'22"W) and first supplied electricity on 20 March 1894.

Following the First World War the demand for electricity was outpacing the available supply. Oldham Corporation built Greenhill power station adjacent to the railway in Churchill Street East (53°32'21"N 2°06'12"W). Greenhill station was first commissioned in 1921 with further generating sets commissioned in 1923 and 1924. In addition Oldham Corporation built another electricity generating station at Slacks Valley known as Chadderton power station which was first commissioned in November 1929.

Equipment specification

Rhodes Bank plant 1898
The original plant at Rhodes Bank power station comprised Willans engines and Charlesworth Hall and Siemens dynamos. To maintain supplies at times of peak demand Crompton-Howell and EPS accumulators were provided. Electricity supplies commenced on 20 March 1894. In 1898 the generating capacity was 657 kW and the maximum load was 413 kW. By 1898  of electricity mains had been laid.

Greenhill plant 1923
In 1923 the generating plant at Greenhill power station comprised:

 Coal-fired boilers producing up to 383,500 lb/h (48.3 kg/s) of steam.  Coal was delivered to the power station via a dedicated railway siding. Steam was supplied to:
 Generators:
 1 × 2,000 kW steam turbo-alternator
 2 × 3,000 kW steam turbo-alternators
 2 × 6,000 kW steam turbo-alternators

These machines gave a total output of 20,000 kW of alternating current.

A variety of electricity supplies were available to consumers:

 3-phase, 50 Hz AC at 400 and 230 Volts
 Direct current 420 and 210 Volts
 Direct current Traction supply 500 Volts

Greenhill plant 1954–1958
In 1954 the plant at Greenhill power station comprised:

 Boilers:
 3 × 25,000 lb/h (3.15 kg/s) Babcock & Wilcox boilers with chain grate stokers
 2 × 15,000 lb/h (1.9 kg/s) Babcock & Wilcox boilers with chain grate stokers
 4 × 10,000 lb/h (1.26 kg/s) Babcock & Wilcox boilers with chain grate stokers

The boilers had a total evaporative capacity of 145,000 lb/h (18.3 kg/s), steam conditions were 200 psi and 650 °F (13.8 bar, 343 °C), which was supplied to:

 Turbo-alternators:
 2 × 6.6 MW Metropolitan-Vickers turbo-alternators, generating at 6.6 kV
 1 × 4 MW Metropolitan-Vickers turbo-alternator, generating at 6.6 kV

The installed capacity was 17.2 MW with an output capacity of 10 MW.

There were also:

 2 × 500 kW GEC motor generators
 1 × 1.25 MW Westinghouse rotary convertor
 3 × 1.5 MW Westinghouse rotary convertors

Condenser cooling water was cooled in five Premier chimney type cooling towers with a capacity of 1.36 million gallons per hour (1.7 m3/s).

Operations

Rhodes Bank operations 1898
In 1898 and there were 213 customers supplied with a total of 305,859 kWh of electricity plus 16,444 kWh for public lighting. The sale of electricity provided revenue of £5,862 for Oldham Corporation against a generating cost of £1,486.

Greenhill operations 1921–23
The operating data for the period 1921–23 was:

Under the terms of the Electricity (Supply) Act 1926 (16 & 17 Geo. 5 c. 51) the Central Electricity Board (CEB) was established in 1926. The CEB identified high efficiency ‘selected’ power stations that would supply electricity most effectively; Greenhill was designated a selected station. The CEB also constructed the national grid (1927–33) to connect power stations within a region. Oldham Greenhill became part of one of the three grid rings in Lancashire. This local ring connected Oldham, Manchester, Tame Valley and Stockport.

Greenhill operations 1946
Greenhill power station operating data for 1946 is given below, data for Chadderton power station is shown for comparison:

Nationalisation
The British electricity supply industry was nationalised in 1948 under the provisions of the Electricity Act 1947 (10 & 11 Geo. 6 c. 54). The Oldham electricity undertaking was abolished, ownership of Greenhill power station was vested in the British Electricity Authority, and subsequently the Central Electricity Authority and the Central Electricity Generating Board (CEGB). At the same time the electricity distribution and sales responsibilities of the Oldham electricity undertaking were transferred to the North Western Electricity Board (NORWEB).

Greenhill operations 1954–58
Operating data for the period 1954–58 was:

Oldham electricity supply district
It served a population of 215,800 (1958). The number of consumers and electricity sold was:

In 1958 the number of units sold to categories of consumers was:

Closure
Greenhill power station was decommissioned in 1960. The buildings were subsequently demolished although a working substation remains on the site.

See also
 Timeline of the UK electricity supply industry
 List of power stations in England
 Chadderton Power Station

References

Coal-fired power stations in England
Demolished power stations in the United Kingdom
Former power stations in England
Buildings and structures in Oldham